The 2021 Rugby Football League Women's Super League South (known as the Betfred Women's Super League South due to sponsorship) was the inaugural season of the Women's Super League South rugby league competition composed of teams from the south of England and Wales. It was originally intended to start in 2020, but was delayed due to the COVID-19 pandemic.

The final fixture list was released on 9 June, and the first match took place on Saturday 19 June.

The grand final saw the Cardiff Demons come from behind in the dying seconds of the match to win the game 30–26.

Teams

Western Conference

Source:

Eastern Conference

Source:

Regular season

Western Conference

Standings

Fixtures

Eastern Conference

Standings

Fixtures

Finals series
The finals series saw the team finishing first in the Western Conference, Cardiff Demons, take on the team finishing second in the Eastern Conference, London Broncos; and first in the Eastern Conference, Army RL, versus second in the Western Conference, the Golden Ferns, in a double header at the Aldershot Military Stadium.

References

External links
Women and girls rugby league

RFL Women's Super League
RFL Women's Super League
RFL Women's Super League
RFL Women's Super League